Sauropleurinae is an extinct subfamily of lepospondyl amphibians. Along with the subfamily Urocordylinae, Sauropleurinae is part of the family Urocordylidae. Like other urocordylids, sauropleurines have long, flattened tails and superficially resemble aquatic newts. They differ from urocordylines in having narrow, pointed skulls. Sauropleurinae includes the genera Sauropleura, Crossotelos, Lepterpeton, and Montcellia, all of which lived during the Late Carboniferous in what is now North America and Europe.

References

Holospondyls
Carboniferous amphibians
Pennsylvanian first appearances
Pennsylvanian extinctions